is a Japanese light novel series written by Kazuma Kamachi and illustrated by Waki Ikawa. ASCII Media Works have published ten volumes from 2014  to 2019 under their Dengeki Bunko label.

Characters

An ace summoner of considerable talent from one of the three main summoner factions, Freedom, but he's considering retiring from the summoning business. However, he constantly suffers from an uncontrollable urge to assist those who ask him for help that prevents him from doing so.

The strongest Unexplored-class Material, one of the beings said to lurk "beyond the realm of the gods".

Media

Light novel
The first light novel volume was published on September 10, 2014, by ASCII Media Works under their Dengeki Bunko imprint. As of June 2019, ten volumes have been published.

References

External links
 

2014 Japanese novels
Dengeki Bunko
Light novels